Lieke Klaus (born October 28, 1989 in Wijchen, Gelderland) is a Dutch BMX racer.

Klaus reached her first podium spot at a BMX World Cup meeting in 2007 when she won the bronze medal in Victoria, British Columbia, Canada. In 2008, she reached the quarter final at the World Championships in Taiyuan and she qualified for the 2008 Summer Olympics in Beijing.

During the 2011 UCI World Championships of BMX in Copenhagen, Denmark, Lieke reached a 14th place in the Elite Women Time-Trial Superfinal and reached a 4th place in the Elite Women Challenge competition.

These results moved Klaus to rank 40 in the world, according to Union Cycliste Internationale (UCI).

Palmarès

BMX
2011 
 14th UCI World Championships, Time-Trial Superfinal
 4th UCI World Championships, Challenge competition

Track cycling
2008
 3rd 2008 Dutch National Track Championships, sprint
2010
 3rd 2010 Dutch National Track Championships, sprint

See also
 List of Dutch Olympic cyclists

References

External links
 
 
 
 
 

1989 births
Living people
BMX riders
Dutch female cyclists
Olympic cyclists of the Netherlands
Cyclists at the 2008 Summer Olympics
People from Wijchen
Cyclists from Gelderland
20th-century Dutch women
21st-century Dutch women